James Buchal was chair of the Multnomah County, Oregon Republican Party. He won the Republican nomination for Oregon Attorney General in 2012 on a write-in campaign, but lost in the general election. He ran unsuccessfully for the United States Congress in 2014. He has spoken strongly in favor of U.S. president Donald Trump. He has served as a lawyer for the far right group Patriot Prayer and against gun control walkouts at Portland Public Schools, has spoken on national television against Multnomah County District Attorney Mike Schmidt, A statement Buchal made on a campaign website in 2014 has been rated "false" by PolitiFact.

References 

Lawyers from Portland, Oregon
Politicians from Portland, Oregon
Oregon Republicans
Living people
Place of birth missing (living people)
Year of birth missing (living people)